The accolades of Australian actress Judy Davis include numerous awards from various international institutions, including eight AACTA Awards, two BAFTA Awards, two Golden Globe Awards, one National Board of Review award, three Primetime Emmy Awards, and one Screen Actors Guild Award.

Davis first came to critical acclaim for her role in My Brilliant Career (1979), for which she won BAFTA Awards for both Best Actress and Most Promising Newcomer. She earned further acclaim in 1984, when she was nominated for the Academy Award for Best Actress for her performance in A Passage to India.

Davis's first major American feature, Woody Allen's Husbands and Wives (1992), saw her nominated for numerous awards: She won a National Board of Review award for Best Supporting Actress, and was nominated for the Academy Award and Golden Globe Award for Best Supporting Actress, the BAFTA for Best Actress. Her subsequent performance in the television film Serving in Silence: The Margarethe Cammermeyer Story (1995) earned Davis a Primetime Emmy Award for Outstanding Supporting Actress, as well as a Golden Globe nomination.

Davis's portrayal of Judy Garland in the television miniseries Life with Judy Garland: Me and My Shadows (2001) garnered her further acclaim, earning her a second Primetime Emmy Award, an American Film Institute Award, a Golden Globe Award, and a Screen Actors Guild Award for Best Actress in a Miniseries or Television Film. Her performance in the miniseries The Starter Wife (2007) saw Davis win a third Prime-time Emmy Award. In 2017, she earned acclaim for her guest-starring role on the limited series Feud, receiving another Primetime Emmy nomination.

AACTA Awards
The Australian Academy of Cinema and Television Arts Awards, formerly known as the Australian Film Institute Awards, are presented annually by the Australian Academy of Cinema and Television Arts (AACTA) to recognize and honor achievements in the film and television industry.

AACTA Awards

AACTA International Awards

Academy Awards
The Academy Awards are a set of awards given by the Academy of Motion Picture Arts and Sciences annually for excellence of cinematic achievements.

American Film Institute Awards

Asia Pacific Screen Awards

Blockbuster Entertainment Awards
The Blockbuster Entertainment Awards were organized by Blockbuster Inc., beginning in 1995.

British Academy Film Awards
The British Academy Film Award is an annual award show presented by the British Academy of Film and Television Arts.

Gemini Awards
The Gemini Awards were awards given by the Academy of Canadian Cinema & Television to recognize the achievements of Canada's television industry.

Genie Awards
The Genie Awards were awarded annually by the Academy of Canadian Cinema and Television to recognize the best of Canadian cinema, from 1980 to 2012.

Golden Globe Awards
The Golden Globe Award is an accolade bestowed by the 93 members of the Hollywood Foreign Press Association (HFPA) recognizing excellence in film and television, both domestic and foreign.

Gracie Awards
The Gracie Awards are awards presented by the Alliance for Women in Media Foundation (AWM) in America, to celebrate and honor programming created for women, by women, and about women.

Independent Spirit Awards
The Independent Spirit Awards are presented annually by Film Independent, to award best in the independent film community.

Inside Film Awards
The Inside Film Awards, contemporarily known as the IF Awards, is an annual awards ceremony and broadcast platform for the Australian film industry, developed by the creators of Inside Film magazine.

Moscow International Film Festival

National Board of Review
The National Board of Review was founded in 1909 in New York City to award "film, domestic and foreign, as both art and entertainment."

Primetime Emmy Awards
The Primetime Emmy Awards are presented annually by the Academy of Television Arts & Sciences, also known as the Television Academy, to recognize and honor achievements in the television industry.

Prism Awards
The annual Prism Awards honors the creative community for accurate portrayals of substance abuse, addiction and mental health in entertainment programming.

Satellite Awards
The Satellite Awards are a set of annual awards given by the International Press Academy.

Screen Actors Guild Awards
The Screen Actors Guild Awards are organized by the Screen Actors Guild‐American Federation of Television and Radio Artists. First awarded in 1995, the awards aim to recognize excellent achievements in film and television.

Critics associations

References

External links
 at IMDb

Lists of awards received by Australian actor